Ha-111 was an Imperial Japanese Navy Ha-101-class submarine. Converted during construction into a submarine tender for midget submarines, she  was completed and commissioned in July 1945, only a few weeks before the end of World War II, the last Ha-101-class submarine to be completed. She surrendered at the end of the war in September 1945, and was scuttled in April 1946.

Design and description

The Ha-101-class submarines were designed as small, cheap transport submarines to resupply isolated island garrisons. They displaced  surfaced and  submerged. They were designed to carry  of cargo.

For surface running, the boats were powered by a single  diesel engine that drove one propeller shaft. When submerged the propeller was driven by a  electric motor. They could reach  on the surface and  underwater. The boats were armed a single mount for a  Type 96 anti-aircraft gun.

Construction and commissioning

Ha-111 was laid down on 6 November 1944 by Mitsubishi at Kobe, Japan, as Small Supply Submarine No. 4611. Renamed Ha-111, she was launched in 1945. During construction, she underwent conversion to a submarine tender for midget submarines, the conversion involving modifying her cargo hold to accommodate ten  torpedoes for midget submarines. She was completed and commissioned on 13 July 1945.

Service history

Upon commissioning, Ha-111 was assigned to the 10th Special Attack Unit. Hostilities between Japan and the Allies ended on 15 August 1945. and she surrendered to the Allies at Saeki on 2 September 1945.

In November 1945, the U.S. Navy ordered Ha-111 to move to Sasebo, Japan.

Disposal
The Japanese struck Ha-111 from the Navy list on 30 November 1945.

Notes

References
 

 
 , History of Pacific War Extra, "Perfect guide, The submarines of the Imperial Japanese Forces", Gakken (Japan), March 2005, 
 Ships of the World special issue Vol.37, History of Japanese Submarines, (Japan), August 1993
 The Maru Special, Japanese Naval Vessels No.43 Japanese Submarines III, Ushio Shobō (Japan), September 1980, Book code 68343-43
 The Maru Special, Japanese Naval Vessels No.132 Japanese Submarines I "Revised edition", Ushio Shobō (Japan), February 1988, Book code 68344-36
 Senshi Sōsho Vol.88, Naval armaments and war preparation (2), "And after the outbreak of war", Asagumo Simbun (Japan), October 1975

Ha-101-class submarines
Ships built by Mitsubishi Heavy Industries
1945 ships
World War II submarines of Japan
Maritime incidents in 1946
Scuttled vessels
Shipwrecks in the Pacific Ocean
Shipwrecks of Japan